The Belfast Harbour Police is a small, specialised ports police force, with responsibility for the Port of Belfast, Northern Ireland. It was founded in 1847, making it the oldest continuously-operating law enforcement agency on the island of Ireland. It is overseen by the metropolitan police in London.

Powers

Officers of this force are sworn in as 'special constables' under section 79 of the Harbours, Docks, and Piers Clauses Act 1847. As a result, officers have the full powers of a constable on any land owned by the Belfast Harbour Authority and at any place within one mile (1.6 km) of any owned land. The extent of Belfast Harbour includes the George Best Belfast City Airport, though policing of the airport by the Harbour Police was discontinued in February 2009. The force comprised 28 constables, six sergeants and one chief officer in 2009. Whilst on duty, BHP officers are armed, which is believed to be a unique situation amongst the small number of privately owned ports police services across the United Kingdom. The service may also enforce the Belfast Harbour Commissioners' by-laws, giving them more powers specific to the harbour.

Officers
Belfast Harbour Police consists of uniformed police officers and a CID section who provide 24-hour cover throughout the 2,000-acre Harbour Estate, including almost 17 miles of roads. Their vehicles are equipped with Tracker stolen vehicle detection devices. Officers are armed with the Glock 17 9mm pistol.

Uniforms
Unlike the green uniforms worn by the Police Service of Northern Ireland, BHP officers wear a black and white uniform, similar to those worn by police officers in Great Britain. Also unlike the PSNI, BHP also uses the standard black and white police sillitoe tartan insignia on their forage caps and the rank insignia for the rank of sergeant incorporates the downturned chevrons, again similar to police agencies in Britain. 

Any major or serious crime and incidents such as murder, acts of terrorism or armed robbery are the responsibility of the local territorial police force, the Police Service of Northern Ireland.

Equipment
Like most Northern Ireland police or public security services, BHP officers are regularly armed and are equipped with the Glock 17, previously being equipped with six-shot revolvers. Officers also carry typical UK police equipment, including a radio, baton, incapcicant spray.

Vehicles
BHP use cars including Volkswagens, Landrover Discovery, Freelanders and Kia Sportage and motorbikes 
to patrol the harbour. Vehicles are equipped in typical UK police blue and yellow style "battenburg" colour scheme, with blue lights and 'Harbour Police' wording.

See also
 Law enforcement in the United Kingdom
 Police Service of Northern Ireland (PSNI)
 Northern Ireland Security Guard Service (NISGS)
 Northern Ireland Prison Service (HMP)
 Royal Ulster Constabulary (RUC)

References

External links
Roll of Honour
Images of Belfast Harbour Police on Flickr

1847 establishments in Ireland
Organizations established in 1847
Police forces of Northern Ireland
Harbour Police
Port police forces of the United Kingdom